Fu Zi may refer to:

Aconitum carmichaelii or Chinese aconite, also known as Fu Zi (附子), a flowering plant sometimes used as an herb
Fu Hao (died  1200 BC), whose name was possibly Fu Zi (婦子) rather than Fu Hao, a consort of King Wu Ding of the Shang dynasty
After This Our Exile (父子), a 2006 Hong Kong film set in Malaysia
Fu Zi (傅子), a 3rd-century Chinese text by Fu Xuan, largely lost

See also
Fusi (pasta), or Fuži in Croatian and Slovenian, a traditional Istrian pasta from Croatia and Slovenia
Confucius (551–479 BC), Chinese philosopher during the Spring and Autumn period, frequently known in Chinese as Fu Zi (夫子)